Walter Magnago (born 10 November 1960) is an Italian former racing cyclist. He rode in the Tour de France and the Giro d'Italia.

References

External links
 

1960 births
Living people
Italian male cyclists
Sportspeople from Trento
Cyclists from Trentino-Alto Adige/Südtirol